Will Arthur Bell was lynched by a mob in Pontotoc County, Mississippi as the local sheriff tried to move him to prevent the lynching. According to the United States Senate Committee on the Judiciary it was the 6th of 61 lynchings during 1922 in the United States.

Alleged attack

On Saturday, January 28, 1922, a young white woman was allegedly attacked by a Black man.

Arrest and lynching

Local police arrested 20-year-old Will Bell and Sheriff Blalock feared that he would be lynched before his trial. He made plans to secretly move Will Bell to the capital of Mississippi, Jackson. Early Sunday morning of January 29, 1922, the sheriff and his deputies made a desperate drive to get Bell to the departing night train but their car was stopped by a mob who used another vehicle to stop the police car. A man jumped out, pulled out a revolver and emptied it into Bell. After he dropped dead other members of the mob fired more shots into him.

Bibliography 
Notes

References
  

 

1922 riots
1922 in Mississippi
African-American history of Mississippi
Deaths by person in Mississippi
Lynching deaths in Mississippi 
February 1922 events
Protest-related deaths
Racially motivated violence against African Americans 
Riots and civil disorder in Mississippi 
White American riots in the United States